Jeff Miller (born 4 July 1962) is a former Australian international rugby union player.
He played as a flanker and was capped 26 times for Australia between 1986 and 1991.
He was a member of the winning Australian squad at the 1991 Rugby World Cup and was also in the squad at the 1987 Rugby World Cup.

References

External links
ESPN Profile

1962 births
Living people
Australian rugby union players
Australia international rugby union players
Place of birth missing (living people)
Rugby union flankers